Auxentius of Milan or of Cappadocia (fl.  – 374), was an Arian theologian and bishop of Milan. Because of his Arian faith, Auxentius is considered by the Catholic Church as an intruder and he is not included in the Catholic lists of the bishops of Milan such as that engraved in the Cathedral of Milan.

Auxentius came to be regarded as the great opponent of the Nicene Creed in the West. His theological doctrines were attacked by Hilary of Poitiers, whose Liber contra Auxentium remains the chief source of information about him.

Life
Auxentius was a native of Cappadocia, and he was ordained as a priest in 343 by Gregory of Cappadocia, the Arian Bishop of Alexandria. According to his opponent Athanasius of Alexandria, Auxentius was "even ignorant of the Latin language, and unskilful in everything except impiety".

The historical period in which Auxentius lived was marked by the fight between the Arians and the supporters of the faith of the Council of Nicaea. In 355, the Roman Emperor Constantius II convened a synod in Milan, in which Dionysius, bishop of Milan, along with Eusebius of Vercelli and Lucifer of Cagliari, opposed the Arian leanings of the Emperor. This resulted in the exile of all three. Shortly thereafter, the Arian bishops, with the support of the Emperor, appointed the Arian Auxentius as new bishop of Milan.

In 359, Auxentius played a relevant role in the Council of Rimini, which supported the Semi-Arian doctrines stated in the Second Council of Sirmium in 351. After Constantius' death, the pagan Emperor Julian (died 363) left Auxentius undisturbed in his diocese.

Under the following Christian Emperors, Jovian and Valentinian I, there were many attempts by the supporters of the Nicaean faith to depose Auxentius. In 364 Auxentius was publicly accused in a disputation with Hilary of Poitiers held in Milan by order of the Emperor Valentinian I. His submission was only apparent, however, and he remained powerful enough to compel the departure of Hilary from Milan. Eusebius of Vercelli and Athanasius of Alexandria also failed to obtain the deposition of Auxentius.

In 372 Pope Damasus I summoned a synod which explicitly condemned Auxentius as heretic. However, Auxentius remained in Milan until his death in 374, even though the Nicaean priest Philastrius (later bishop of Brescia) operated in Milan to support the Catholic population. Auxentius was succeeded by the Nicaean Ambrose.

Notes

4th-century births
374 deaths
4th-century Christian theologians
Arian bishops
4th-century Romans
4th-century Italian bishops
Bishops of Milan
Nicene Creed